The Girls' singles tournament of the 2006 BWF World Junior Championships is a badminton world junior individual championships for the Eye Level Cups, held on November 6–11. The defending champion of the last edition is Cheng Shao-chieh from Chinese Taipei. The top seeded Wang Yihan of China won the gold medal in this event after beat Saina Nehwal of India in straight games with the score 21–13, 21–9.

Seeded 

 Wang Yihan (champion)
 Lyddia Cheah (fourth round)
 Han Li (quarter-final)
 Liu Jie (quarter-final)
 Pia Zebadiah Bernadet (quarter-final)
 Cheng Wen (quarter-final)
 Jang Soo-young (fourth round)
 Kim Moon-hi (Semi final)
 Porntip Buranaprasertsuk (fourth round)
 Michelle Cheung (second round)
 Vivian Hoo (fourth round)
 Hung Shih-han (third round)
 Karina Jørgensen (third round)
 Saina Nehwal (final)
 Tee Jing Yi (third round)
 Xing Aiying (third round)

Draw

Finals

Top Half

Section 1

Section 2

Section 3

Section 4

Bottom Half

Section 5

Section 6

Section 7

Section 8

References

External links 
 Tournament Draw at www.koreabadminton.org

2006 BWF World Junior Championships
2006 in youth sport